Puan Partido is a partido in the south west of Buenos Aires Province in Argentina.

Economy

The economy of Puan Partido is dominated by agriculture. The main crops are wheat, barley and oats, which are processed in the Maltería Pampa (Pampa brewery), which is one of the largest breweries in South America.

Other agricultural products of the region are sunflowers, soya beans and maize. Beef farming also plays a major role in the rural economy, the main breeds are Aberdeen Angus and Polled Hereford.

Settlements

External links

 
 Federal Website

1886 establishments in Argentina
Partidos of Buenos Aires Province